The Bank of Montreal Building (BMO building) is located near the waterfront, and was home to the Bank of Montreal in Halifax, Nova Scotia, Canada before it moved to the new Halifax Convention Centre in December 2017. The office tower stands at 73 meters with 18 floors. The building is located on 5151 George Street in the core of Downtown Halifax.

Citco Fund Services, a hedge fund administrator, occupies the 2nd, 3rd, 4th, 7th, 8th, and 17th floors, making them the primary occupants of the building.

For a complete list of buildings/structures in Halifax, refer to List of buildings in the Halifax Regional Municipality.

Buildings and structures in Halifax, Nova Scotia
Bank buildings in Canada
Bank of Montreal